Paul Aizley (born 1936 in Boston, Massachusetts) is an American politician who represented District 41 in the Nevada Assembly for three terms, from 2009 to 2014. Aizley was the Assembly's speaker pro tempore during his third term, from 2013 to 2014.

Education
Aizley attended the University of Washington, earned his BA from Harvard University, his MS from the University of Arizona, and his PhD from Arizona State University.

Elections
 2008: When Democratic Assemblyman David Parks ran for Nevada Senate and left the House District 41 seat open, Aizley won the three-way August 12 Democratic Primary with 723 votes (71.44%), and won the three-way November 4 General election with 7,675 votes (62.21%) against Republican nominee Tim Rowland and Independent American candidate Kenneth Rex.
 2010: Aizley was unopposed for the June 8 Democratic Primary and won the November 2 General election with 4,950 votes (56.69%) against Republican nominee Jan Porter.
 2012: Aizley was unopposed for the June 12 Democratic Primary and won the November 6 General election with 11,680 votes (54.19%) against Republican nominee Phil Regeski.
 2014: Aizley was defeated for reelection to the Assembly by Republican Victoria A. Dooling by a vote of 5,829 (55.72%) to 4,632 (44.28%).
 2016: Aizley is running for reelection to the Assembly from District 41.

References

External links
 Campaign site
 
 Biography at Ballotpedia
 Financial information (state office) at the National Institute for Money in State Politics

Date of birth missing (living people)
1936 births
Living people
Arizona State University alumni
Harvard University alumni
Democratic Party members of the Nevada Assembly
Politicians from Boston
People from the Las Vegas Valley
University of Arizona alumni
University of Washington alumni